The Royal Society of South Australia (RSSA) is a learned society whose interest is in science, particularly, but not only, of South Australia. The major aim of the society is the promotion and diffusion of scientific knowledge, particularly in relation to natural sciences. The society was originally the Adelaide Philosophical Society, founded on 10 January 1853. The title "Royal" was granted by Queen Victoria in October 1880 and the society changed its name to its present name at this time. It was incorporated in 1883. It also operates under the banner Science South Australia.

History
The origins of the Royal Society are related to the South Australian Literary and Scientific Association, founded in August 1834, before the colonisation of South Australia, and whose book collection eventually formed the kernel of the State Library of South Australia.
 
The Society had its origins in a meeting at the Stephens Place home of J. L. Young (founder of the Adelaide Educational Institution) on the evening of 10 January 1853. Members inducted to the new "Adelaide Philosophical Society" were Messrs. John Brown, John Howard Clark, Davy, Doswell, Charles Gregory Feinaigle, Gilbert, Gosse, Hamilton, Hammond, W. B. Hays, Jones, Kay, Mann, W. W. Whitridge, Williams, Wooldridge and John Lorenzo Young. J. Howard Clark was elected secretary. On 15 September rules were adopted and His Excellency the Governor Sir Henry Young was elected president. T. D. Smeaton has also been credited with helping found the Society. Its aim was "the diffusion and advancement of the Arts and Sciences", and one of its earliest subjects of discussion was the formation of a museum showing the natural history of the Colony.

At the time of its first Annual General Meeting membership had risen to 35, and in 1859 the Society was incorporated under the South Australian Institute Act. The establishment of the University of Adelaide in 1875 revitalised the Society, which had flagged for some years before.

It received royal patronage, becoming the Royal Society of South Australia late in 1880, following the nomenclature used in other Australian colonies, and perhaps hoping to emulate their success.

The Field Naturalists Society of South Australia was formed as a section of the Society in 1883. In 1943 Constance Eardley became the first woman to be elected to the Council of the Society.

Membership
There are five classes of members:
 Honorary Fellows
 Sustaining Fellows
 Fellows
 Associate Fellows
 Student Fellows

Awards and medals
The society awards:
 The Verco Medal
 The Publication Medal
 The Royal Society of South Australia Postgraduate Student Prize
 The H. G. Andrewartha Medal

Publications
The RSSA has published the journal Transactions of the Royal Society of South Australia since 1879, previously (from 1877–1878) Transactions and proceedings and report of the Philosophical Society of Adelaide. From 2004, the journal partnered with the South Australian Museum in the Southern Scientific Press, amalgamating their two journals. From 2005, the journal has been available in electronic form only, via Taylor & Francis Online.

In June 2020 an annotated list of 95 Australian bird fossils was published in the Transactions, the first such list since 1975, contributing to the documented knowledge of bird extinctions. The list includes three species of huge flamingos from the Kati Thanda-Lake Eyre and Lake Frome areas of South Australia, which were estimated to inhabit the area for 25 million years before becoming extinct about 140,000 years ago, most likely from drought.

List of presidents
Royal Society of South Australia Presidents:

Verco Medal recipients
"The medal shall be awarded for distinguished scientific work published by a Fellow of the Royal Society of South Australia. It is the highest honour that the Society can bestow on one of its Fellows. Only those who have made a significant, outstanding contribution to their field(s) of study receive the award."

The medal is named in honour of Joseph Verco. The first award of the medal was to Prof Walter Howchin in 1929.

Previous winners include:

Notable members
Notable members of the Royal Society of South Australia have included:
 Prof. William Henry Bragg,
 Prof. Sir Robert William Chapman,
 Thomas Charles Cloud (died 1918),
 Alexander William Dobbie (born 1843),
 John William Hall Hullett (born 1847),
 Prof. Horace Lamb
 Dr. Cecil Thomas Madigan (1889–1947),
 James McGeorge,
 Thomas Parker,
 Walter Rutt (1842–1925),
 Prof. Ralph Tate
 Sir Charles Todd,
 Carl Albert Unbehaun (1851–1924) and
 Robert Archibald White.

See also
 Australian Academy of Science
 Australian and New Zealand Association for the Advancement of Science
 Federation of Australian Scientific and Technological Societies
 Royal Society of New South Wales
 Royal Society of Queensland
 Royal Society of Tasmania
 Royal Society of Victoria
 Royal Society of Western Australia
 The Royal Society (The Royal Society of London for Improving Natural Knowledge)
 Royal Society (disambiguation)

References

Further reading

External links

 The Story of the Royal Society, The Register News-Pictorial (Adelaide, SA), 22 March 1929, p. 13

Society of South Australia, Royal
Learned societies of Australia
Organisations based in Adelaide
Clubs and societies in South Australia
1853 establishments in Australia